The 1981 Arkansas State Indians football team was an American football team that represented the Arkansas State University as a member of the Southland Conference during the 1981 NCAA Division I-A football season. In their third season under head coach Larry Lacewell, the Indians compiled an overall record of 6–5 with a mark of 3–2 in conference play, placing third in the Southland.

Schedule

References

Arkansas State
Arkansas State Red Wolves football seasons
Arkansas State Indians football